Rest in Power may refer to:

 Rest in power, an expression to mourn, remember or celebrate a deceased Black person
 Rest in Power: The Enduring Life of Trayvon Martin, a 2017 book
 Rest in Power: The Trayvon Martin Story, a 2018 TV series